The Gustaf Adolf Church is a church building in the  at Östermalm in Stockholm, Sweden. Belonging to the Oscar Parish of the Church of Sweden, the church was inaugurated on 6 November 1892 by bishop Gottfrid Billing.

References

External links

19th-century Church of Sweden church buildings
Churches in Stockholm
Churches in the Diocese of Stockholm (Church of Sweden)
Churches completed in 1892
Gothic Revival church buildings in Sweden